The Lebanese Center for Energy Conservation (LCEC) is the national energy agency for Lebanon. It is a governmental organization within the Lebanese Ministry of Energy and Water (MEW). LCEC is the technical arm of the Ministry in all subjects related to energy efficiency, renewable energy, and green buildings. LCEC provides energy efficiency and renewable energy programs to the public and private sectors in Lebanon.

LCEC has been a financially and administratively independent organization since 2011. LCEC's origins are in 2005 when it was initiated as a joint project between the Ministry of Energy and Water and the United Nations Development Programme (UNDP) Lebanon.

Overview

LCEC is the technical arm of the government of Lebanon working towards institutionalizing all national efforts to:
 Improve and raise awareness energy efficiency in the main sectors of the economy.
 Encourage the use of renewable energy technologies through technical and policy support.
 Provide reliable data on energy demand patterns and distribution.
 Produce measurable and sustainable global benefits in terms of long-term greenhouse gas (GHG) emissions reductions.

It tries to reduce greenhouse gases emissions by:
 Providing business and the public sector with expert advice, finance and accreditation.
 Stimulating demand for energy efficiency and renewable energy products through developing national awareness campaigns.
 Developing energy efficiency standards and labels.
 The creation and support of Energy Services Companies (ESCOs).
 Establishing partnerships with public and private sectors.
 Representing Lebanon in international energy efficiency and renewable energy associations.
 Providing a national energy database.
 Promoting the Clean Development Mechanism (CDM) for carbon offsets.
LCEC has established itself as a technical point of reference specialized in energy conservation issues within the Lebanese Ministry of Energy and Water.

LCEC works on setting national strategies and action plans to be adopted by the Lebanese Government. LCEC also works on the implementation and the quality control of national projects and initiatives in the country. Moreover, LCEC is involved in the update and development of the legal and administrative framework needed for the greening of the energy sector.

The main driver of the LCEC is the National Energy Efficiency Action Plan (NEEAP) that summarizes the national efforts in energy efficiency and renewable energy. At the 2009 Copenhagen Climate Summit, Lebanon voluntarily pledged to increase the renewable energy share to 12% by 2020. This voluntary commitment was anchored within the "Policy Paper for the Electricity Sector" prepared by the Ministry of Energy and Water and officially adopted by the Council of Ministers in June 2010.

Following this, LCEC developed the NEEAP Lebanon 20112015 which was adopted in August 2010 by the Ministry of Energy and Water and approved in November 2011 by the Lebanese Government. NEEAP summarizes all national objectives, programmes and policies in 14 independent but correlated initiatives in the energy efficiency and renewable energy sectors. NEEAP was prepared in conformance with the Arab EE guideline (based on the EU directive 2006/32/EC on energy end-use efficiency and energy service) and Lebanon was the first Arab country to officially adopt such plan. LCEC is currently updating the NEEAP while preparing the Renewable Energy Strategy for Lebanon that will include several scenarios in achieving the set target of 12% RE by 2020 and that will also be in accordance with the Arab renewable energy guideline under preparation.

Moreover, LCEC provides both the public and private sector with expert advice, finance and accreditation, develops energy efficiency standards and labels, and provides national energy database indicators.

History
Back in 2002, the Ministry of Energy and Water (MEW) and United Nations Development Programme (UNDP) signed an agreement to create a new project called "Cross-sectoral energy efficiency and removal of barriers to ESCO operation". The project was co-funded by the Global Environment Facility (GEF) and the Ministry of Energy and Water under the direct management of UNDP Lebanon.

One main objective of this project was to create a national energy agency for Lebanon to be called the Lebanese Center for Energy Conservation (LCEC). The project team started its operation in early 2005, and gradually the project name changed to LCEC. The LCEC project succeeded in implementing a number of activities to push for energy efficiency development in Lebanon. Gradually, LCEC gradually established itself as an independent technical national center offering the Lebanese Government and more specifically the Ministry of Energy and Water all kinds of services dedicated to energy efficiency and renewable energy.

The role of the LCEC project was consolidated as an independent technical national center in the Memorandum of Understanding (MoU) that signed between MEW and UNDP on 18 June 2007. GEF and UNDP extended their support to the LCEC in 2009 until the end of 2013.

In 2013, the financial and administrative support of GEF and UNDP to LCEC came to an end. During that same year, LCEC received its first financial support from the Lebanese Ministry of Energy and Water (MEW). The MEW support ensured the sustainability of the center for a minimum of 5 years. LCEC also benefits from the support of the European Union (EU) through a contract signed with the Central Bank of Lebanon (BDL).

Partnerships 
The work of LCEC is characterized by various partnerships with national and international private and public entities.

the Ministry of Energy and Water is the central public organization in charge of the energy sector in Lebanon. LCEC is affiliated to the Ministry of Energy and Water in all major decisions, initiatives and projects related to energy efficiency and renewable energy.

LCEC is also the technical partner of the Central Bank of Lebanon (BDL) in the review and evaluation of all technical applications to low-interest energy loans submitted to BDL.

Policy development
At the 2009 Copenhagen Climate Summit, Lebanon voluntarily pledged to increase the renewable energy shares to 12% by 2020. This voluntary commitment was anchored within the "Policy Paper for the Electricity Sector" prepared by the Ministry of Energy and Water (MEW) and officially adopted by the Council of Ministers in June 2010: it includes 10 strategic initiatives for the improvement of infrastructure, supply and demand systems and the definition of legal framework. Two key initiatives target respectively the Renewable Energy and the Demand Side Management / Energy Efficiency.

National Energy Efficiency Action Plan
Following the "Policy Paper for the Electricity Sector" prepared by the Ministry of Energy and Water (MEW) and officially adopted by the Council of Ministers in June 2010, LCEC developed the National Energy Efficiency Action Plan 20112015 for Lebanon (NEEAP) to achieve the national target of 12% renewable energy share by 2020. NEEAP summarizes all national objectives, programmes and policies in 14 initiatives in the energy efficiency and renewable energy sectors.
The initiatives of the NEEAP are the following:
 Initiative 1: Towards Banning the Import of Incandescent Lamps to Lebanon
 Initiative 2: Adoption of the Energy Conservation Law and Institutionalization of the Lebanese Center for Energy Conservation (LCEC) as the National Agency for Lebanon
 Initiative 3: Promotion of Decentralization Power Generation by PV and Wind Applications in the Residential and Commercial Sectors 
 Initiative 4: Solar Water Heaters for Buildings and Institutions 
 Initiative 5: Design and implementation of a national strategy for efficient and economic public street Lighting in Lebanon 
 Initiative 6: Electricity Generation from Wind Power 
 Initiative 7: Electricity Generation from Solar Energy 
 Initiative 8: Hydro Power for Electricity Generation 
 Initiative 9: Geothermal energy in Lebanon, Waste to Energy, and Other Technologies 
 Initiative 10: Building Code for Lebanon 
 Initiative 11: Financing Mechanisms and Incentive
 Initiative 12: Awareness and Capacity Building 
 Initiative 13: Paving the Way for Energy Audit and ESCO Business 
 Initiative 14: Promotion of Energy Efficient Equipment

NEEAP 20122020, NREAP and RES 
LCEC is currently updating and developing the NEEAP 20152020 while preparing the Renewable Energy Strategy (RES) and the National Renewable Energy Action Plan (NREAP) for Lebanon. The Lebanese NEEAP was prepared in conformance with the Arab EE guideline (based on the EU directive 2006/32/EC on energy end-use efficiency and energy service) and Lebanon was the first Arab country to officially adopt such plan.

Pilot projects 

The activities of the Lebanese Center for Energy Conservation (LCEC) expand to the implementation of pilot projects in the energy efficiency and renewable energy sector. Through grants, donations, and partnerships, LCEC was successful in implementing different pilot projects and is currently working on the implementation of many others. Pilot projects help initiate a new momentum in the market, and most importantly offer an opportunity to benefit from the lessons learnt.

2006: 500 solar water heaters

The Chinese government donated 500 solar water heaters to be installed in the liberated areas in South Lebanon. The Lebanese Center for Energy Conservation (LCEC) was assigned by the Ministry of Energy and Water (MEW) to support its installation both technically and financially. The workload consisted of handling all project logistics, hosting Chinese experts to conduct an intensive training workshop, assisting in the selection of beneficiaries.

In addition to the above, a sum of US$112,500 was raised to cater for the installation of the units.

Unfortunately and as a result of the July war in Lebanon, 200 solar units were destroyed. In this regards, and after the impressive success of the project, LCEC has followed up with the Chinese Embassy to provide Lebanon with similar donation due to its direct results on the beneficiaries. This could be achieved and will be offered under the second phase of the project.

Project information
Date of implementation: Q3 2006
Donation: 500 solar water heaters
Type of donation: in-kind
Application type: evacuated tube solar water heaters
Beneficiaries: 417 residences and public health centers
Areas covered: liberated areas in South Lebanon
Role of LCEC: technical agency

Achievements
Collection area: 1,270 sq. meters
Annual energy production: 1,018 MWh
Annual energy cost saving (consumer side): $71,000
Annual energy cost saving (EDL side): $326,000
Annual GHG emissions reduction: 848 tons

Implemented by
Kypros
Falcon Win Trading
Ghaddar Industry
Tfaily Solar
Mihsen Reda Co.

2008: Solar water heaters for not-for-profit facilities

The United Nations Development Program, through its Energy and Environment Programme, with the funding of the Swedish International Development Agency (SIDA), has launched a pilot project to install solar water heaters at publicNGO facilities in selected damaged areas of Beirut, Bekaa and South Lebanon due to July 2006 war.
Under the supervision of the Lebanese Center for Energy Conservation (LCEC), the project consisted of installing 93 individual (natural circulation) solar water heaters, and 11 collective (forced circulation) solar water heaters, covering a total of 1,040 square meters of collection area.
The solar water heating units were executed by three qualified firms through an international bid, and divided into five lots.

Project information
Date of implementation: Q1 2008
Donation: 104 solar water heating systems (11 Collective and 93 Individual)
Type of donation: cash
Application type: individual and collective solar water heating systems
Beneficiaries: 104 hospitals, orphanages, elderly centers, health care, Red Cross, and civil defense centers
Areas covered: Bekaa, South, and Beirut Suburbs
Role of LCEC: administrator

Achievements
Collection area: 1,040 square meters
Annual energy production: 1,017 MWh
Annual energy cost saving (consumer side): $81,000
Annual energy cost saving (EDL side): $324,000
Annual GHG emissions reduction: 744 tons

Implemented by
Aquatherma Engineering
Kypros Solar
Dawtec

CFL pilot project in Niha, Bekaa

Based on a collaboration agreement signed between LCEC and Electricité de Zahlé (EDZ), EDZ installed around 1,048 Compact Fluorescent Lamps (CFLs) in the village of Niha in the Bekaa area, completely free-of-charge. The 1,048 CFLs were purchased by LCEC and the installation was offered free-of-charge by EDZ as an in-kind contribution.

The direct objective of the pilot project is to reduce the energy bill of the different consumers and therefore remove part of the financial burden on families in this area. Another major objective is the reduction of GHG emissions generated by inefficient lighting. In addition, setting this project as a success story supported by real achieved savings can increase the market share of energy efficient lighting in Lebanon and consequently boost the market toward the phase out of incandescent bulbs in the country. This strategy goes with the different strategies followed by many countries in Europe, America, and Australia. Finally, the project shall achieve a percentage of dollars savings in the national energy bill.

There are two very important reasons for which the project has chosen EDZ for this installation. EDZ is a professional electrical utility that has online control on the electricity consumption in each and every house. This means that EDZ is able to track the changes in the energy bills resulting from the project implementation and can therefore report on the measurement and savings in kWh and in dollars. The second reason is that the management at EDZ is ready to support this program financially at a later stage.

Following a site survey done by EDZ, LCEC supplied around 1,048 CFL's of different sizes to EDZ with a total cost not exceeding $2,500.

Due to the importance of this pilot project, the event was covered by the media in every aspect. In fact, a press release was distributed to the main newspapers in town, namely Annahar, Assafir, Al Anwar, and Al Mustaqbal. In addition, the project was covered by two main television stations in Lebanon, namely LBCI and NTV.

Recently, LCEC in collaboration with EDZ has worked on developing a complete study report on the success of this project, one year after its completion. The results of the study will be published soon by LCEC.

These pilot projects are preparing the ground towards implanting a clear DSM strategy developing currently. The strategy shall target the installation of a massive number of CFL fixtures all over Lebanon.

Chinese government grant  Phase 2 

After the success of the 500 solar water heaters donated by the People's Republic of China and subsequent to the Israeli's attacks in July 2006 leading to the destruction of 200 of units earlier that year, the LCEC and the Ministry of Energy & Water (MEW) have been closely coordinating with the Chinese government to proceed with a phase 2 grant that will include 600 solar water heaters of similar capacity and type of phase 1 (208 L tank capacity and 28 glass tubes).

Project information
Date of Initiation: Q1 2010
Donation: 600 solar water heaters (200 to replace damaged of Phase 1 plus 400 new installations)
Type of donation: in-kind
Application type: evacuated tube solar water heaters
Beneficiaries: 417 residences and public health centers
Areas covered: residences and non-profit facilities
Role of LCEC: technical agency

Projected achievements
Collection area: 1,524 square meters
Annual energy production: 1,221 MWh
Annual energy cost saving (consumer side): $97,000
Annual energy cost saving (EDL side): $445,000
Annual GHG emissions reduction: 1,017 tons

Beirut River Solar Snake
The "Beirut River Solar Snake" (BRSS) is the 1st pilot project in Lebanon to produce electricity from solar energy. It was launched by the Ministry of Energy and Water (MEW) in 2013 and is under the supervision and management of LCEC. The project will be extended over a distance of 6.5 km on the top of the Beirut River and have 10 MW installed capacity to be the first grid connected solar farm that seeks to generate and supply EDL with clean energy. The project will also have a technical building. The implementation of the first phase has an installed capacity of 1 MW extending over an area of 16,000 m2. The cost of the 1st phase of the project is $3.1 Million (with a budget of $4 million) and is completely financed by MEW. The execution of the first phase started in July 2014 is now completed.

Public Street Lighting
LCEC was engaged in the public street lighting project and managed the installation of 500 solar street lights at the end of December 2014 through a grant by the Chinese Government in the Dora, Jounieh, Cornet Chehwan and Batroun areas.

French FASEP Initiative for Solar Photovoltaic Educational Platform
The "Educational and Demonstration Platform for Renewable Energies in Lebanon" project is a joint initiative between the French company Transénergie and the Ministry of Energy and Water represented by LCEC with the direct support of the Industrial Research Institute (IRI) and UNDP Lebanon. It aims at the installation of an educational platform to be used by researchers, educational institutions, university students, as well as professionals in the solar photovoltaic sector.

Global Solar Water Heating Market Transformation and Strengthening Initiative 
A main component of LCEC's work is the GEF-funded project "Global Solar Water Heating Market Transformation and Strengthening Initiative" aiming at the installation of around 190,000 square meters of solar water heaters (SWHs) during the timeline of the project from 2010 until the end of 2014. Another aim of the project is to help the market reach a total annual sale of 50,000 m2 and the installation of 1,050,000 square meters of SWHs capacity by 2020. To achieve these goals, the project worked on pilot installation of solar water heating, on training engineers and technicians, advertisement and marketing, and all other aspects that affect the solar water heating market growth.

Till July 2014, a total of 5,878 installations were approved for SWH loans, and 49.63% of which benefited from the $200 subsidy. In total, 33,239 systems sold between 2012 and 2013.
 
Moreover, LCEC provides both the public and private sector with expert advice, finance and accreditation, develops energy efficiency standards and labels, and provides national energy database indicators.

ESCO Companies
Since 2001, a nationwide program on energy audits for medium and large consuming facilities was initiated. This was a project financed by the Global Environment Facility (GEF), managed by the United Nations Development Programme (UNDP), and called "Lebanon Cross Sectoral Energy Efficiency and Removal of Barriers to ESCO Operation". The initial period 20022004 saw delays in project implementation; consequently, the project was essentially restarted with a new project team in 2005 and was operational until the end of 2009.
The project was mainly targeting the high combined consumption of energy in industrial plants and buildings, where the potential for energy savings is important and promising. In 2006, LCEC aimed and worked on creating a market for ESCOs (Energy Service Companies that offer energy efficiency improvement services) where the end user can request a specialized ESCO to conduct an energy audit.

Over 125 audits were completed within the project, mostly for large facilities.
 
Only one ESCO was operational at the beginning of the programme. In 2010 only 8 ESCOs where active, nowadays more than 30 are available and the market is still expanding rapidly. 
To further support the growth of the ESCOs market, LCEC launched an initiative in NEAAP called "Paving the Way for Energy Audit and ESCO Business". The purpose of this initiative is to support the development of the ESCO working in the energy audit business and provide them with the suitable financial, fiscal and technical incentives to remove all the obstacles hindering their growth. To support this initiative, LCEC has offered periodical trainings, workshops and seminars on energy audit activities and procedures to technician, engineers, bankers and to all those involved in the field.
The ESCO pre-qualification programme was launched by LCEC by 2014 in order to regulate the market and have a recommended list of companies for potential projects.

Financing 

The National Energy Efficiency and Renewable Energy Action (NEEREA) is a green financing mechanism that allows private sector entities to apply to subsidized loans for any type of EE and/or RE projects.
The loan has a ceiling of $20 million and is offered at an interest rate of 0.6% for 14 years. The greens loans are provided through any of the Lebanese commercial banks to directly reach the end user. The European Union is contributing to NEEREA by offering a grant over a share of the investment cost of maximum $5 million, 15% for nonsubsidized sectors and 5% for subsidized sectors.

By January 2015, more than 200 projects were approved under the NEEREA financing mechanism with a total amount of more than $200 Million. Results show that around 60% of the projects were for solar photovoltaic while 82% of loans amount were for green buildings.

References

External links 
 lcec.org.lb

Lebanese governmental organisations
Energy in Lebanon
Energy conservation